The Southern Terminal, Susquehanna and Tidewater Canal is a national historic district at Havre de Grace, Harford County, Maryland, United States.  Located along the western bank of the Susquehanna River near its mouth at the Chesapeake Bay, it includes the Lock Master's House, the canal's outlet lock, and the foundations of a bulkhead wharf along the river side of the lock. Most of the structures built to serve aspects of the Susquehanna and Tidewater Canal operations are no longer standing, but the locations of warehouses, stables, and several other buildings, including a broom factory, are shown on old city maps.

It was added to the National Register of Historic Places in 1987.

References

External links
, including photo dated 1999, at Maryland Historical Trust

Canals on the National Register of Historic Places in Maryland
Buildings and structures in Havre de Grace, Maryland
Historic districts in Harford County, Maryland
Transportation buildings and structures in Harford County, Maryland
Historic districts on the National Register of Historic Places in Maryland
National Register of Historic Places in Harford County, Maryland
Canals in Maryland